The 1982 New York Mets season was the 21st regular season for the Mets. They went 65–97 and finished in sixth place in the National League East. They were managed by George Bamberger. They played home games at Shea Stadium.

Beginning that year, to supplement gameday broadcasts for cable viewers, Mets game broadcasts were simulcast on SportsChannel NY in addition to the usual WOR-TV telecast.

Offseason 
 December 11, 1981: Doug Flynn and Dan Boitano were traded by the Mets to the Texas Rangers for Jim Kern.
 October 12, 1981: Mike Marshall was released by the New York Mets.
 February 10, 1982: Alex Treviño, Jim Kern, and Greg Harris were traded by the Mets to the Cincinnati Reds for George Foster.

Regular season

Season standings

Record vs. opponents

Notable transactions 
 April 1, 1982: Lee Mazzilli was traded by the Mets to the Texas Rangers for Ron Darling and Walt Terrell.
 April 5, 1982: Mike Cubbage was released by the Mets.
 May 10, 1982: Manuel Lee was signed as an amateur free agent by the Mets.
 May 21, 1982: Rick Sweet was purchased from the Mets by the Seattle Mariners.
 June 7, 1982: 1982 Major League Baseball Draft
Dwight Gooden was drafted by the Mets in the 1st round (5th pick). Player signed June 10, 1982.
Tracy Jones was drafted by the Mets in the 4th round.
Randy Myers was drafted by the Mets in the 1st round (9th pick) of the Secondary Phase. Player signed June 8, 1982.
 August 4, 1982: Joel Youngblood was traded by the Mets to the Montreal Expos for a player to be named later. The Expos completed the trade by sending Tom Gorman to the Mets on August 16.

Joel Youngblood 
On August 4, 1982, Youngblood became the first player in history to get hits for two different teams in two different cities on the same day. Youngblood had driven in the winning run for the Mets in an afternoon game at Wrigley Field against the Chicago Cubs, and then singled in a night game for the Montreal Expos in Philadelphia after he had been traded. The two pitchers he hit safely against, Ferguson Jenkins of the Cubs and Steve Carlton of the Philadelphia Phillies, are both in the Baseball Hall of Fame.

Roster

Player stats

Batting

Starters by position 
Note: Pos = Position; G = Games played; AB = At bats; H = Hits; Avg. = Batting average; HR = Home runs; RBI = Runs batted in

Other batters 
Note: G = Games played; AB = At bats; H = Hits; Avg. = Batting average; HR = Home runs; RBI = Runs batted in

Pitching

Starting pitchers 
Note: G = Games pitched; IP = Innings pitched; W = Wins; L = Losses; ERA = Earned run average; SO = Strikeouts

Other pitchers 
Note: G = Games pitched; IP = Innings pitched; W = Wins; L = Losses; ERA = Earned run average; SO = Strikeouts

Relief pitchers 
Note: G = Games pitched; W = Wins; L = Losses; SV = Saves; ERA = Earned run average; SO = Strikeouts

Farm system 

LEAGUE CHAMPIONS: Tidewater

Notes

References 

1982 New York Mets at Baseball Reference
1982 New York Mets team page at www.baseball-almanac.com

New York Mets seasons
New York Mets
New York Mets
1980s in Queens